"Decode" is a song by American rock band Paramore for the soundtrack of the 2008 romantic fantasy film Twilight. It was written by group members Hayley Williams, Josh Farro, and Taylor York. The song was first made available October 1, 2008 through Twilight author Stephenie Meyer's website. "Decode" was promoted to American modern rock radio by Fueled by Ramen and impacted on October 21, 2008, serving as the soundtrack's lead single. It is also included as a bonus track on the international version of Paramore's third studio album, Brand New Eyes (2009).

"Decode" was an international commercial success, charting in the top 20 of the singles charts in Australia, France, and New Zealand, as well as earning the band their second top 40 hit on the Billboard Hot 100. The song was certified Platinum in the United States on February 16, 2010, selling over 1,000,000 copies. It was awarded the Teen Choice Award for Choice Rock Song, and was also nominated for a Grammy Award in 2010 in the category of Best Song Written for a Motion Picture, Television or Other Visual Media.

Background
Hayley Williams explained how the song's title and lyrics were inspired by the complicated relationship between the book's protagonists:

Composition
"Decode" is an emo inflected alternative and hard rock song written by Hayley Williams, Josh Farro, and Taylor York specifically for the Twilight film. It, along with "I Caught Myself", was recorded in September 2008 in Nashville, Tennessee. According to the digital sheet music published by Alfred Publishing Co. Inc., "Decode" was composed in the key of B flat minor and set in common time to a "moderately slow" tempo of 84 BPM. The song features a vocal range of one octave, seven notes, and one semi-tone – from the note of G to the note of F – and follows a chord progression of F7 — Am/D — Am — Em.

The song opens with a four bar musical interlude before Williams begins singing. The song's lyrics speak to confusion regarding one's emotions and a growing sense of uncertainty. "How can I decide what's right when you're clouding up my mind?" she demands in the opening line, while in the chorus she asks, "How did we get here, when I used to know you so well?" According to Heather Phares of AllMusic, "Decode" expounds "Bella Swan's supernatural love triangle angst."

Critical reception
Alexandra Cahill of Billboard gave the song a positive review, writing, "vocalist Hayley Williams captures the tension and urgency between Edward and Bella with an impassioned, yet restrained performance". Cahill also stated, "expertly crafted follow-up Decode promises to stake a claim at modern rock and top 40 radio". Leah Greenblatt of Entertainment Weekly said that "Decode" took a step away from Paramore's "bouncier punk-pop sound for a more sprawling, Evanescence-like romanticism". Heather Phares of AllMusic complimented Williams's "crystalline vocals" on the track, but conceded that it failed to "match the best moments from the band's albums."

Variety ranked it as one of the best emo songs of all time in 2022.

Accolades
"Decode" was nominated for Best Song Written for a Motion Picture, Television or Other Visual Media at the 52nd Annual Grammy Awards (2010), but lost to "Jai Ho" from Slumdog Millionaire. It was the group's second Grammy nomination, and first as songwriters (their previous nomination being for Best New Artist in 2008).

Commercial performance

North America
"Decode" debuted at number 35 on the Alternative Songs (then called Hot Modern Rock Tracks) chart dated October 25, 2008. It reached a peak position of 5 on the chart dated January 31, 2009, giving the band their third top ten hit on the chart, and spent 10 weeks in the top ten. "Decode" debuted at number 34 on the Billboard Hot 100 chart dated November 22, 2008, a career-best debut at the time. Seven weeks after its debut, it reached a new peak of 33, on the chart dated January 10, 2009. This earned the band their second top forty hit. "Decode" also experienced moderate crossover success, charting at number 36 on the Billboard Mainstream Top 40 chart. As of October 2009, the song had sold 927,000 copies in the United States. In February 2010, the single was certified Platinum by RIAA, indicating sales of over 1,000,000.

In Canada, "Decode" debuted at number 52 on the Canadian Hot 100 chart dated November 22, 2008. It rose 30 places (from 78 to 48) on the chart dated January 10, 2009 and peaked at this ranking. This earned the band their first top fifty hit in that country. "Decode" would remain the band's highest-charting single in Canada until the chart dated October 16, 2010, when "The Only Exception" rose 69 to 25.

International
In Australia, "Decode" debuted at number 36 on the ARIA Singles Chart for the week of November 24, 2008, the group's first top fifty effort. The song reached a peak position of 12 in its tenth week, on the chart of January 26, 2009. "Decode" was certified Gold by ARIA in 2009 and was later certified Platinum in 2010.

In New Zealand, the song debuted at number 40 on the Official New Zealand Music Chart for the week of November 24, 2008 and peaked at number 15 on the chart of January 26, 2009. The song was certified Gold by Recorded Music NZ in July 2009, indicating sales of over 7,500.

In the United Kingdom, "Decode" entered the UK Singles Chart at number 78 for the week of December 14–20, 2008 and rose to its peak of 52 the following week.

The song also peaked at number 59 in Austria, 9 in Finland, 10 in France (their highest peak to date), 47 in Germany, 53 in Japan, and 60 in Switzerland.

Music video
The official music video for "Decode" was shot in mid-October 2008 and was directed by Shane Drake. A teaser clip was presented by MTV on October 28, 2008 as part of the network's "Twilight Tuesday" promotion. The video premiered in full through MTV and its subsidiaries on November 3, 2008 one day ahead of the release of the soundtrack on which the song is featured. From December 11 to December 18, 2008, the music video and the film trailer were shown in the North American theater of PlayStation Home. The music video is included as a bonus feature with an introduction by the film's director, Catherine Hardwicke, on the DVD/Blu-ray release of Twilight.

The video features the band members walking and performing in the woods in Nashville, Tennessee (purporting to be Forks, Washington). While they play, there are also scenes of the band acting as tracker vampires searching through the woods. Clips of the Twilight film, primarily those used in the trailer, are also featured throughout the video.

As of May 2022, the song has 400 million views on YouTube.

Track listings

Cover versions
Joy Electric released a version of "Decode" on their 2009 cover album Favorites at Play. The song was performed on American Idol by season 11 finalist Colton Dixon during the top 24 week and by season 13 finalist Jena Irene during the top 11 week, the latter of which was a "Songs from the Cinema" theme.

Live performances
Paramore has included the song in their setlist for their 2009–2012 Brand New Eyes World Tour and their 2014 Parahoy! event aboard the Norwegian Pearl cruise ship.

Charts

Weekly charts

Year-end charts

Certifications

Release history

Notes

References

2008 singles
2008 songs
Atlantic Records singles
Fueled by Ramen singles
Music videos directed by Shane Drake
Paramore songs
Song recordings produced by Rob Cavallo
Songs from The Twilight Saga (film series)
Songs written by Hayley Williams
Songs written by Josh Farro
Songs written by Taylor York
Warner Music Group singles